Patti Jo "PJ" Hirabayashi is one of the pioneers of the North American Taiko movement. She is the founder of TaikoPeace, President of Kodo Arts Sphere America (KASA), and co-founder of Creatives for Compassionate Communities-a grassroots art-ivist group originating in San Jose, California. She is also the Artistic Director Emeritus and charter member of San Jose Taiko, the third taiko group to form in the United States. Her signature composition, "Ei Ja Nai Ka", is a celebration of immigrant life expressed in taiko drumming, dance, and voice that continues to be performed around the world.

She and her husband Roy Hirabayashi are recipients of the 2011 National Heritage Fellowship awarded by the National Endowment for the Arts, which is the United States government's highest honor in the folk and traditional arts.

Personal life
Hirabayashi was born on May 18, 1950 in San Rafael, California. She is a third-generation Japanese (Sansei) and was raised in the San Francisco Bay Area. As a child, PJ got involved in dance, studying styles such as tap, ballet, and acrobatics. She attended Irvington High School where she would study piano and guitar in addition to dance.

For college, she initially attended California State University, Hayward (CSU Hayward) where she majored in math for two years with the plan to become a computer analyst. PJ's years in college coincided with the Civil Rights Movement, which gained a lot of steam in colleges across the nation in terms of organized protest. While in college PJ began to become aware of the internment experience of WWII and of other injustices to people of color, and because of this she began to get involved in community activism and Asian American studies. She then transferred to University of California, Berkeley with a Social Science major (a combination of ethnic studies, sociology, and psychology) where she focused on Asian-American studies. After obtaining her degree in Social Science from Berkeley, she spent a year in Japan before returning to San Jose to obtain a master's degree in Urban and Regional Planning from San Jose State University in 1977. Her master's thesis is on the preservation of San Jose's Japantown, and has become a widely used reference for research and for community action committees currently discussing the preservation of San Jose Japantown. From 1977 to 1979, she served as Acting Coordinator for "Asian American Communities" classes and supervisor for students gaining fieldwork experience in Asian American service organizations.

She began to get involved in the early formations of San Jose Taiko in 1973 through Roy Hirabayashi whom she met in 1969 during her years at CSU Hayward. They would eventually get married and become the leaders of San Jose Taiko, Roy as the managing director and PJ as the artistic director.

Taiko involvement
PJ had some exposure to taiko through Obon festivals growing up. However, she was finally struck by it during a performance by San Francisco Taiko Dojo through a cultural program featured through the Issei project she was involved with. In this performance she saw two women performing on equal level with the men and, "remembered thinking, that's fantastic to see women play such a powerful activity, [yet] still be connected to Japanese culture." After this, PJ had an interest to connect to her Japanese heritage through the art of taiko. When she returned to San Jose State in 1973 she was able to get involved with taiko because Roy Hirabayashi had just started San Jose Taiko. Even though PJ had never had any prior instruction of taiko before, under training from groups such as Ondekoza, Kodo, Warabi-za, and Oedo Sukeroku, PJ went on to become a leading taiko artist and teacher.

The year 1987 was when San Jose Taiko was first invited to tour Japan through the group Ondekoza. Even though San Jose had at times been called illegitimate because of their break from traditional Japanese taiko and an embracing of a more fused sound combining Japanese rhythms with American and World influences, they were widely received by Japanese audiences. This inspired San Jose to become a more serious professional taiko group. In 1991, San Jose Taiko went on their first touring series across the United States to present the unique style of San Jose Taiko to parts of America that may not have had any exposure to the art form previously. PJ is a part of the touring group that tours both the US and internationally, presenting taiko to over 100,000 people per year.

Until July 2011 PJ was the artistic director of San Jose Taiko where she oversaw rehearsals, developed the training program and curriculum of San Jose Taiko, developed costumes, composed some of the repertoire, and facilitated the artistic development of the group. In addition to this, she also directed the performing company's workshops, master classes, and audition process.

Considered a pioneer of North American taiko, she is recognized in the international taiko community for her distinctive performance and teaching style that combine movement, dance, drumming, fluidity, joy, and energy.

Collaborations and awards

Collaborations
PJ has participated in notable San Jose Taiko collaborations such as - George Coates Performance Works, American Conservatory Theater, Asian American Jazz Orchestra, San Jose Repertory Theater, Brenda Wong Aoki, Zakir Hussain, Kagemusha Taiko and Kodo. As a solo artist, she has performed with Hiroshima, David Benoit, San Jose Symphony, San Francisco Symphone, Ondekoza, Margaret Wingrove Dance Company, and Teatre Yugen.

Awards
PJ is a recipient of the Pacific Asian Women's "Woman Warrior Award" in the Arts (1987), the "Women's Fund Award in the Arts" (1990) in Santa Clara County, and the Silicon Valley Arts and Business Awards' "Arts Leadership Award" (2010). For her activism she has received the Asian Americans for Community Involvement's "Arts Community Star Award" (2003), the Silicon Valley Asian Pacific American Democratic Club's "Community Activist Award"(2005), and the Japanese American Citizens' League's "Community Recognition Award"(2007). She holds other various awards pertaining to her artistry and her preservation work in San Jose Japantown, including the prestigious National Heritage Fellowship (2011) from the National Endowment for the Arts.

Works

Compositions
 Hachijo/Noto (Co-written with Roy Hirabayashi) 1987
 Miyoshi no Ki (Co-written with Roy Hirabayashi) 1987
 Bamboo Drums (Co-written with Roy Hirabayashi) 1990
 Celebration (Co-written with Roy Hirabayashi) 1992
 Ei Ja Nai Ka? 1994
 Matsuri Gensokyoku (Co-written with Yumi Ishihara, Anna Lin &  Jeremy Nishihara) 1995
 Fukai Tokoro Kara 1995
 Do-Kan 2001
 Tottemo Yoi (Co-written with Yumi Ishihara) 2002
 Ichigo Ichie (Co-written with Nobuko Miyamoto & Yoko Fujimoto) 2003
 Moving in Time (Co-written with Roy Hirabayashi) 2004

Recordings
 San Jose Taiko Group, Bamboo Brew Productions  1978
 San Jose Taiko "15th Anniversary Concert", Sokai Audio 1988
 San Jose Taiko, "Insight Through Sound", Sokai Audio 1991
 San Jose Taiko, "Kodama, Echoes of the Soul", SJT 1993
 San Jose Taiko, "Moichi Do -  One More Time", SJT/Sokai Audio 1996
 Anthony Brown, "Family", Asian Improv 1996
 Asian American Jazz Orchestra, "Big Bands Behind Barbed Wire", Asian Improv  1998
 Mark Izu, "Last Dance", Asian Improv 1998
 "Rhythm Journey", San Jose Taiko 2005
 The Triangle Project: "Journey of the Dandelion", Bindu Records 2005
 "3-Decades", San Jose Taiko (DVD) 2008

References

Further reading

 Rindfleisch, Jan. (2017) with articles by Maribel Alvarez and Raj Jayadev, edited by Nancy Hom and Ann Sherman. Roots and Offshoots: Silicon Valley’s Arts Community. pp. 71–75. Santa Clara, CA: Ginger Press. 

1950 births
Living people
National Heritage Fellowship winners
American musicians of Japanese descent
People from San Rafael, California
California State University, East Bay alumni
University of California, Berkeley alumni
San Jose State University alumni
Musicians from California
Taiko players